José Luis Gómez (born September 10, 1993) is an Argentine footballer who plays as a right-back for Racing Club. In 2014, he won the league with Racing Club.

Honours

International
Argentina
Superclásico de las Américas: 2017

References

External links
 
 
 

1993 births
Living people
Association football fullbacks
Argentine footballers
Argentina international footballers
Footballers at the 2016 Summer Olympics
Olympic footballers of Argentina
Club Atlético Lanús footballers
San Martín de San Juan footballers
Racing Club de Avellaneda footballers
Club Atlético Huracán footballers
People from Santiago del Estero
Sportspeople from Santiago del Estero Province